The Armide class was a type of 40-gun frigates of the French Navy, designed by Pierre Roland.

Vessels in class

Builder: Rochefort
Begun:
Launched: 1804
Completed:
Fate: captured by British Navy, 1806.

Minerve
Builder: Rochefort
Begun:
Launched: 1805
Completed:
Fate: captured by British Navy, 1806.

Builder: Bordeaux
Begun:
Launched: 1806
Completed:
Fate: sold for scrap, 1828.

Builder: Rochefort
Begun:
Launched: 1806
Completed:
Fate: wrecked, 1811.

Builder: Cherbourg
Begun:
Launched: 1808
Completed:
Fate: burnt, 1809.

Builder: Bordeaux
Begun:
Launched: 1808
Completed:
Fate: captured by British Navy, 1809.

Saale
Builder: Rochefort
Begun:
Launched: 1810
Completed:
Fate: deleted, 1821.

Alcmène
Builder: Cherbourg
Begun:
Launched: 1811
Completed:
Fate: captured by British Navy, 1814.

Circé
Builder: Rochefort
Begun:
Launched: 1811
Completed:
Fate: deleted, 1844.

 Androméde
Builder: Bayonne
Begun:
Launched:
Completed:
Fate: never reached launch stage.

 Emeraude
Builder: Bayonne
Begun:
Launched:
Completed:
Fate: never reached launch stage.

 Cornélie
Builder: Bayonne
Begun:
Launched:
Completed:
Fate: never reached launch stage.

Antigone
Builder: Bordeaux
Begun:
Launched: 1816
Completed:
Fate:

Cléopatre
Builder: Cherbourg
Begun:
Launched: 1817
Completed:
Fate:

Magicienne
Builder: Rochefort
Begun:
Launched: 1823
Completed:
Fate:

Sources and references 

 
Frigate classes
Ship classes of the French Navy